The expression Maceo-Dickinson line was used in Texas in the early/mid 20th century referring to the Galveston County line. The expression was a pun which made reference to the Mason-Dixon line. From the 1920s to the 1950s the Maceo crime syndicate controlled Galveston, Texas and established a gambling empire there that ran through much of the county, including casinos in Dickinson, Texas. The county had a notoriously lax law enforcement environment which represented a sharp contrast with neighboring counties, particularly in the later years.

See also
 Free State of Galveston, which discusses this era in Galveston's history.
 Sam Maceo and Rosario Maceo, the brothers that ran the gambling empire.

Galveston, Texas
History of Texas